Robert Mangaliso Sobukwe (5 December 1924 – 27 February 1978) was a prominent South African anti-apartheid revolutionary and founding member of the Pan Africanist Congress (PAC), serving as the first president of the organization.

Sobukwe was regarded as a strong proponent of an Africanist future for South Africa and opposed political collaboration with anyone other than Africans, defining "African" as anyone who lives in and pays his allegiance to Africa and who is prepared to subject himself to African majority rule. In March 1960, Sobukwe organized and launched a non-violent protest campaign against pass laws, for which he was sentenced to three years in prison on grounds of incitement. In 1963, the enactment of the "Sobukwe Clause," allowed an indefinite renewal of his prison sentence, and Sobukwe was subsequently relocated to Robben Island for solitary confinement. At the end of his sixth year at Robben Island, he was released and placed under house arrest until his death in 1978.

Early life

Childhood: 1924–1947 
Sobukwe was born in Graaff-Reinet in the Eastern Cape Province on 5 December 1924, as the youngest child of Hubert and Angelina Sobukwe. While his father worked as a general store clerk and part-time woodcutter, Sobukwe's Xhosa mother served as a domestic worker in white homes. He grew up in a poor household and was educated at a local Methodist mission for primary school. At age 15, Sobukwe continued and eventually completed his secondary education at the Healdtown Institute, which provided a Methodist Christian and liberal arts education to all students.

Fort Hare: 1947–1949 
In 1947, Sobukwe enrolled at the South African Native College at Fort Hare, the premier undergraduate institution for black students of his time. Although Sobukwe was initially not interested in politics, his study of Native Administration (relating to the administration of South Africa's Bantustans), combined with his exposure to politics at Fort Hare, made Sobukwe keener to the topic.

*He joined the African National Congress Youth League (ANCYL) in 1948. The organisation had been established on the university campus by Godfrey Pitje, who later became its president. In 1949, Sobukwe was elected as the first president of the Fort Hare Students' Representative Council, where he proved himself to be a distinguished orator.

Mainstream politics

Standerton: 1950–1954 
In 1950, Sobukwe was appointed as a teacher at a high school in Standerton, a position he lost when he spoke out in favour of the Defiance Campaign in 1952; he was, however, later reinstated. In 1952, Sobukwe achieved notoriety backing the Defiance Campaign. During this period he was not directly involved with mainstream ANC activities, but still held the position of secretary of the organisation's branch in Standerton.

Johannesburg: 1954–1959 
In 1954, after moving to Johannesburg, Sobukwe became a lecturer of African Studies at the University of the Witwatersrand. During his time in Johannesburg he became editor of The Africanist newspaper and soon began to criticise the ANC for allowing itself to be dominated by sympathizers of the Progressive Party, which he termed "liberal-left-multi-racialists". He was an ardent supporter of Africanist views about liberation in South Africa and rejected the idea of working with Whites.

Pan-Africanist Congress: 1959–1960

Formation and ideology 
Sobukwe was a strong believer in an Africanist future for South Africa and rejected any model suggesting working with anyone other than Africans, defining African as anyone who lives in and pays his allegiance to Africa and who is prepared to subject himself to African majority rule. He grew discontented with the progress of the liberation struggle during the 1950s, in which the apartheid government continually introduced new means to suppress the liberation struggle. Resonating with many members of the ANC, Sobukwe had become impatient with the ANC's inability to achieve results. He later left the ANC to form the Pan Africanist Congress (PAC), and was elected its first President in 1959.

Sobukwe became known as the Professor or simply "Prof" to his close comrades and followers, a testament to his educational achievements and powers of speech and persuasion. He spoke of the need for black South Africans to "liberate themselves" without the help of non-Africans; Sobukwe defined non-Africans as anyone who lives in Africa or abroad Africa and who does not pay his allegiance to Africa and who is not prepared to subject himself to African majority rule. His strong convictions and active resistance inspired many other individuals and organisations involved in the anti-apartheid movement, notably the Black Consciousness Movement).

Sobukwe argued that whites should be excluded from the ANC as it was impossible to have a relationship between blacks and whites until further progress had been made. He argued that a reliance on whites would disempower the realization that many of these Africans had, that they had the power to overtake a society that had been taken from them. Sobukwe rejected collaboration with sympathetic whites as he considered such multi-racial cooperation between slave owner and slave as an "ungodly alliance" before equality was attained.

Anti-pass campaign of 1960 
On 21 March 1960, the PAC led a nationwide protest against the pass laws which required black people to carry a pass book at all times. Sobukwe led a march to the local police station at Orlando, Soweto, in order to openly defy the laws. He was joined en route by a few followers and, after presenting his pass to a police officer, he purposely made himself guilty under the terms of the pass law of being present in a region/area other than that allowed as per his papers. In a similar protest on the same day in Sharpeville, police opened fire on a crowd of PAC supporters, killing 69 in the Sharpeville Massacre. In the aftermath, Sobukwe was taken without a fair trial and both the ANC and PAC were banned. Other organizations such as Desmond Tutu's Black Consciousness Movement were inspired by the actions of Sobukwe.

Imprisonment

Initial imprisonment: 1960–1963 
Following Sobukwe's arrest after the Sharpeville massacre, he was charged with and convicted of incitement, and sentenced to three years in prison. He served one year of his sentence in Witbank Prison (1960—1961) followed by two years in Pretoria Gaol (1961—1963).

Robben Island: 1963–1969 
As the end of Sobukwe's three-year sentence approached, the National Party parliament passed the General Law Amendment Act, which introduced a clause allowing for political dissidents to be indefinitely detained. This allowed Sobukwe's sentence to be renewed for an additional six years, which he spent on Robben Island. The clause became known as the "Sobukwe Clause" as no other individual was sentenced under this provision. At Robben Island, Sobukwe was in company of other revolutionaries in liberation struggle such as Nelson Mandela, Johnson Mlambo, and John Nyathi Pokela, among many others.Sobukwe was kept in solitary confinement but enjoyed a unique prisoner-plus status; he was permitted certain privileges including books, magazines, newspapers, civilian clothing, etc. He lived in a separate area on the island and was strictly prohibited from contact with other prisoners, though Sobukwe was able to communicate sporadically through visual signals while outside for exercise. He studied during this time and received (among others) a degree in economics from the University of London. It is speculated that Sobukwe was subjected to this special treatment because the South African government had profiled him as a greater troublemaker than the regular ANC prisoners. Sobukwe's son disputes terming this treatment as "special".

Throughout his imprisonment, Sobukwe maintained communication with his friend Benjamin Pogrund who later became his biographer.

House arrest: 1969–1978 
As authorities recognized Sobukwe's deteriorating physical and mental health, he was released from Robben Island in 1969. Sobukwe was allowed to live in Kimberley with his family but remained under house arrest. Kimberley was suggested as an area where he could not easily foster subversive activities and also a place where he could live and work while being easily monitored by the state. He was also restricted through a banning order, which disallowed political activities.

Various restrictions barred Sobukwe from travelling overseas, thus curtailing his attempts to further his education. For this same reason, he had to turn down several positions as a teacher at various locations in the United States. Sobukwe completed his law degree with the help of a local lawyer, in Galeshewe, and he then started his own practice in 1975 in Kimberley.

Illness and death
In early 1977, Sobukwe fell ill and applied for permission to receive medical treatment; his request was denied indefinitely until the intervention of his friend Benjamin Pogrund. Subsequently, in September 1977, Sobukwe travelled to Johannesburg where he was diagnosed with lung cancer and then transferred to a hospital in Cape Town. Although the South African government granted Sobukwe access to treatment, they imposed strict conditions on his travel; Sobukwe was required to report to a police station every time he left Kimberley or arrived at the hospital. He died from complications of lung cancer on 27 February 1978 and was buried in Graaf-Reinet on 11 March 1978.

Legacy
Sobukwe has become a key historical figure in the black liberation struggle of South Africa. His vision of a society dedicated to individual rights, irrespective of race or ethnicity, is shared by many of his contemporaries such as in elements of the ANC and Pan-Africanists.:478 In Sobukwe's 1959 PAC inaugural speech, he shared a sentiment that continues to be quoted by anti-racism rhetoric in popular media, as he stated:There is only one race to which we all belong, and that is the human race. In our vocabulary therefore, the word 'race' as applied to man, has no plural form.Following Sobukwe's imprisonment and the official South African banning of the anti-apartheid parties in 1960, the influence of the Pan-Africanist Congress steadily waned and was eventually overshadowed again by the African National Congress. The PAC, along with many other anti-apartheid organizations, were forced to move to underground operations. Under the leadership of Potlako Leballo, the PAC came to sponsor and create a paramilitary wing Poqo. Leballo's revolutionary rhetoric inspired the planning of violent operations, ultimately leading to the public arrest of 3,246 PAC and Poqo members.

In 2012, Robert Sobukwe Street in Pretoria (formerly known as Esselen Street) was renamed after him in commemoration of his contributions to the black liberation struggle. Similarly, in 2013, Robert Sobukwe Road in Cape Town (formerly known as Modderdam Road) was renamed after him. Central Block at the University of the Witwatersrand was renamed to Robert Sobukwe Block in 2016 following major support among students and alumni.

See also
Benjamin Pogrund, author of Robert Sobukwe's biography Sobukwe and Apartheid (1990) and How Can Man Die Better: The Life of Robert Sobukwe (2003)
List of people subject to banning orders under apartheid

References

External links
Robert Sobukwe - Leader of The Africanist
Collection of historical papers on Robert Mangaliso Sobukwe at The University of the Witwatersrand Library
 Austil Mathebula, "Robert Sobukwe, a lesser known hero", The Citizen, 19 March 2015

1924 births
1978 deaths
Alumni of the University of London
Anti-apartheid activists
Inmates of Robben Island
Pan Africanist Congress of Azania politicians
People from Graaff-Reinet
South African pan-Africanists
University of Fort Hare alumni
Xhosa people